Vipindas (1938 – 12 February 2011) was an Indian cinematographer and director. He has cinematographed more than 200 films in Malayalam alone, and has directed a couple of films.

Biography
Vipindas was born in 1938 in Pazhayannur, Thrissur, Kerala, as the son of Pallippatta Sankaran Nair and Lakshmi Amma. At the age of 15, he went to Madras (now Chennai) to study photography. He had no formal education in photography but was able to assist veteran Bollywood cinematographer Beevashom for three years. Vipindas started his film career with the Tamil film Thalattu, which he also directed. He debuted in Malayalam through Prethangalude Thazhvara by P.Venu. It was followed by Prathidhwani, directed by him but filmed by veteran director I. V. Sasi. This film established the successful collaboration of Sasi and Vipindas. He worked as a cinematographer with Sasi in about twenty five films. He also collaborated with several directors including P. A. Backer, Fazil, Hariharan, Joshiy, K. Madhu, Padmarajan and Bharathan. His last work was Thathwamasi, directed by Sunil. He died on 12 February 2011.

Selected filmography
 Prethangalude Thaazhvazha
 Prathidhwani
 Manimuzhakkam (Winner, Kerala State Film Award for Best Photography)
 Kabani Nadi Chuvannappol
 Avalude Ravukal
 Moonnam Mura
 Oru CBI Diary Kurippu
 Thuramukham
 Nirakkoottu
 Irupatham Noottandu
 Chillu
 Purappadu
 Adhipan
 Jagratha
 Oru Kochu Swapnam
 Thathwamasi
 Adayalam
 Randam Varavu
 Mounam Sammadham
 Aankiliyude Tharattu
 Oru Sindoora Pottinte Ormaykku
 Ee Kaikalil
 Adukkan Entheluppam
 Iniyum Kurukshethram
 Ente Kanakkuyil
 Azhiyatha Bandhangal
 Kaiyum Thalayum Purathidaruthu
 Piriyilla Naam
 Belt Mathai
 Changatham
 Ponmudy
 Oridathoru Phayalwan
 Kallan Pavithran (1981)
 Parvathi
 Oru Kochu Swapnam (Directed)
 Prathidhawani (Directed)

References

External links
 

1938 births
2011 deaths
People from Thrissur district
Malayalam film cinematographers
Film directors from Kerala
Malayalam film directors
Kerala State Film Award winners
Cinematographers from Kerala
20th-century Indian film directors
20th-century Indian photographers